James John Lewis (born 16 January 1902, date of death unknown) was a Welsh footballer who played in the English Football League for Cardiff City, Newport County and Tranmere Rovers. He was born in Newport.

Career
Lewis started his career at his home town club Newport County, joined Cardiff City in 1924. Having made just one appearance for the club, during a 4–1 defeat against Bury, Lewis was called into the Wales squad for the British Home Championship match against Scotland on 31 October 1925, which ended in a 3–0 defeat. Lewis never played for Wales or Cardiff City again, moving to Tranmere Rovers where he went on to make over 250 appearances.

References

External links

Welsh footballers
Wales international footballers
Cardiff City F.C. players
Newport County A.F.C. players
Tranmere Rovers F.C. players
English Football League players
1902 births
Year of death missing
Association football wing halves
Footballers from Newport, Wales